One Piece is an anime series adapted from the manga of the same title written by Eiichiro Oda. Produced by Toei Animation, and directed by Konosuke Uda and Munehisa Sakai, the first eight seasons were broadcast on Fuji Television from October 20, 1999 to April 30, 2006. One Piece follows the adventures of Monkey D. Luffy, a 17-year-old boy whose body has gained the properties of rubber from accidentally eating a supernatural fruit, and his crew of diverse pirates, the Straw Hat Pirates. Luffy's greatest ambition is to obtain the world's ultimate treasure, One Piece, and thereby become the next King of the Pirates.

The series uses 42 different pieces of theme music: 24 opening themes and 18 closing themes. Several CDs that contain the theme music and other tracks have been released by Toei Animation. The first DVD compilation was released on February 21, 2001, with individual volumes releasing monthly. The Singaporean company Odex released part of the series locally in English and Japanese in the form of dual audio video CDs.

In 2004, 4Kids Entertainment licensed the first five seasons for an English-language broadcast in North America. This dub was heavily edited for content, as well as length, reducing the first 143 episodes to 104, and thus receiving large amounts of controversy and fan backlash. One Piece made its U.S. premiere on September 18, 2004, on the Fox network's Fox Box programming block, and also began airing on the Cartoon Network's Toonami block in April 2005. In December 2006, 4Kids cancelled production due to financial reasons.

In April 2007, Funimation Entertainment acquired the license of One Piece from 4Kids and would use their in-house voice cast in preparation for the series' DVD releases which also included redubbed versions of the episodes dubbed by 4Kids. Beginning with the sixth season, the Funimation dubbed episodes aired on Cartoon Network's Toonami block from September 2007 until March 2008, airing episodes 144 to 167. In Australia, Cartoon Network would resume airing new episodes in April 2008, and aired the remainder of the season from November 2008 to January 2009, form episode 170 through 195. The dub would later return to Toonami, now broadcast on Adult Swim, in May 2013. Adult Swim's broadcast began with episode 207 and continued until the show's removal in March 2017, after episode 384. The series would eventually return to the block in January 2022, beginning on episode 517.

The first unedited, bilingual DVD box set, containing 13 episodes, was released on May 27, 2008. Similarly sized sets followed with 31 sets released as of July 2015. Episodes had begun streaming since August 29, 2009.

Episode list

Season 1: East Blue (1999–2001)

Season 2: Entering into the Grand Line (2001)

Season 3: Introducing Chopper at the Winter Island (2001)

Season 4: Arrival & Fierce Fighting in Alabasta (2001–02)

Season 5: Dreams!, The Zenny Pirate Crew Sortie!, Beyond the Rainbow (2002–03)

Season 6: Sky Island ~ Skypiea & The Golden Bell (2003–04)

Starting in Season 6, 4Kids dropped One Piece and the rights were picked up by Funimation. The episode numbers and titles were restored to their original Japanese versions with slight differences in situations where 4Kids terms (from the TV series and video games) were kept for the TV broadcast. Funimation did not continue the practice of combining or cutting episodes, though some edits to the content started by 4Kids were still kept for broadcast purposes.

The Australian broadcasts began airing uncut episodes starting with 175.

Season 7: Escape! The Marine Fortress & The Foxy Pirate Crew (2004–05)

Season 8: Water Seven (2005–06)

OVAs

Releases

Japanese

VHS

DVD

Blu-ray
The Eternal Log releases contain 16:9 versions of the episodes in standard definition Blu-ray format.

English

4Kids

Uncut

In Australia, the Season sets were named Collection 1 through 21 and the Collection Boxes were named Treasure Chest Collections. In North America, the 2015 Collection Boxes are exclusive to Amazon and packaged with art cards, stickers and a poster; the 2019 release of Box One, renamed 20th Anniversary Pirate Collection, is exclusive to Walmart and bundled with a t-shirt.

Notes

References

Episodes
One Piece episodes